The University of the Sunshine Coast Bus Station, at Sippy Downs, is serviced by TransLink bus routes. It is located in the campus grounds at the University of the Sunshine Coast. It is in Zone 6 of the TransLink integrated public transport system.

External links
About the University of the Sunshine Coast bus station and green link

References

Bus stations in South East Queensland
Public transport in Sunshine Coast, Queensland